Fossarina picta is a species of very small sea snail, a marine gastropod mollusc or micromollusk in the family Trochidae, the top snails.

Description
The shell grows to a length of 4 mm. The depressed, turbinate shell is very similar to Fossarina patula, but the spiral lirae are equal and simple. The shell contains four convex whorls. The body whorl is large with  a rounded margin. The sharp lips are arcuate. The aperture is nearly circular. The outline of the shell is more orbicular. The shell is marked with irregular purple-black radiating blotches. The umbilical region is generally pale yellow.

Distribution 
This marine species  occurs off the coat of South Korea and Japan.

References

External links

picta
Gastropods described in 1864